The Long Blondes were an English indie rock band formed in Sheffield in 2003 by Dorian Cox (lead guitar and keyboards), Reenie Hollis (real name Kathryn Hollis) (bass guitar and backing vocals), Emma Chaplin (rhythm guitar, keyboards and backing vocals), Kate Jackson (lead vocals) and Screech Louder (real name Mark Turvey, drums).

After several critically acclaimed singles, they released their debut album, Someone to Drive You Home, on Rough Trade Records in November 2006. Their second album, Couples, was produced by Erol Alkan and released in April 2008. On 20 October 2008, due to the unexpected illness of their primary songwriter and lead guitarist, Dorian Cox, the band announced their amicable split via a message on their website, the same day their singles compilation, "Singles" was released. In 2021, The Long Blondes reunited as a duo composed of Jackson and Cox.

Career
The band was formed in 2003 in Sheffield, United Kingdom. All the members were attending, or had attended university in the city. The following quote appeared on their website and served as an introduction to the Long Blondes; "Our shared influences include The Mael Brothers, Marx Brothers and The Bewlay Brothers. We do not listen to The Beatles, The Rolling Stones, Jimi Hendrix, The Doors or Bob Dylan. We chose an instrument each and learnt to play it.". The band have stated that the original inspiration for The Long Blondes was to form a fantasy pop group: "Nico, Nancy Sinatra, Diana Dors and Barbara Windsor. Sexy and literate, flippant and heartbreaking all at once." Singer Kate Jackson was inspired by bands with front women like Siouxsie and the Banshees and Blondie.

Independent releases
In July 2004, The Long Blondes released their debut single "New Idols" on the local Thee Sheffield Phonographic Corporation label. This was followed by singles "Autonomy Boy" and "Giddy Stratospheres", on Angular. In 2005, they released further singles, "Appropriation (By Any Other Name)" and "Separated By Motorways", the latter being produced by Paul Epworth and released on his own Good & Evil label. These releases were met with a positive critical reaction and growing media attention.

Still unsigned, in February 2006 the band were recipients of the NME Philip Hall Radar Award, which in previous years was won by Franz Ferdinand and Kaiser Chiefs. Further adding to their reputation, the band were named by The Guardian and Vogue as "the best unsigned band in the UK". As they were unsigned, during the early success of the band, members remained working in various day jobs; Jackson sold vintage clothing on eBay, Cox was working in the University of Sheffield Department of Law, Hollis in the Media Studies department of a nearby college, Chaplin in a Leeds art library and Louder in the Home Office.

Someone to Drive You Home
On 13 April 2006 they signed to Rough Trade Records and began recording their debut album over the summer with Steve Mackey, the bassist with Pulp. The album was preceded by the singles "Weekend Without Makeup" in July and "Once and Never Again", which was released on 23 October and debuted at number 30 in the UK Singles Chart. The song was named the 15th best track of 2006 by NME.
Someone to Drive You Home was released in November 2006. The music was written by the band collectively while the majority of the lyrics were written by Cox with Jackson completing the lyrics for "Separated by Motorways" and "Madame Ray". Critical reception was generally positive with the NME calling it "fantasy pop, performed to perfection" in a 9/10 review. Reviews picked up on the predominant themes of the album; outsider status, popular culture references from the 1950s and 60s and relationships from a female perspective. Other reviews indicated the numerous inspirations for the work. For example, a four-star review in The Guardian said that "if talent borrows but genius steals ... the Long Blondes should be taking their Mensa tests", comparing the album's style to Franz Ferdinand and 80s indie-pop band The Flatmates. Some noted the impact of Jackson's voice; Colin Roberts of Drowned in Sound said "her delivery is like a public address call across a Sunday marketplace" while The Guardian said it was "marvellously belting, if unsubtle". A 3-star review in Uncut magazine recognised the ambition of the band's sound, advising that they should acquire "a ruthless pop producer, one who can coax them out of their indie-pop dowdiness – like Blondie needed Mike Chapman, like ABC needed Horn." They appeared at a number of UK festivals over the summer of 2006, including the Carling Weekend. In 2007, they played on the Other Stage at the Glastonbury Festival.

"Couples" and "Singles"
After an extended European tour, in October 2007 The Long Blondes began work on their second album with producer Erol Alkan, who had previously produced their more dance orientated b-sides such as "Five Ways To End It" and "Fulwood Babylon". On 19 December 2007, it was announced that the new album's title would be "Couples". The title alludes to the David Bowie album "Heroes" and also to a loose theme of the album as a "big breakup album". Before the album was released, all five members created their own cryptic promo videos explaining the inspiration behind "Couples". The band stated that the album drew influences from Italo disco revival acts such as Glass Candy and the Italians Do It Better label. and ABBA. Cox stated that "...there's something really innocent about Abba videos... really kinda funny, futuristic but old fashioned at the same time and that's how we see our music on this album.".

"Couples" was released on 7 April 2008, preceded by a single, "Century", released on 24 March 2008. The album reached number 48 in the UK album chart. The album was generally well received by critics. Click Music gave the album a 4.5 out of 5 and said it was "a worthy contender for record of the year". The Guardian gave the album another 4-star review, noting the album's shift in style – saying that some tracks shared "more with the cinematic perfection of Kylie Minogue's "Confide in Me" than the kitchen sink dramas of Pulp". A mixed 6/10 review in NME said the album was "not terrible, but disappointing" and "whereas once they sang of suburban boredom tempered with the thrill of escape, now they’ve started to sound like they’d be happy to stay put". After "Century", the next song to be taken off the album was "Guilt", which was released on 7" and digital download.

On 9 June 2008, the band posted on their official website that Cox had fallen ill and that he had to be rushed to hospital, which meant that they had to cancel all their live appearances until the end of July. The band were due to play a support slot on Duran Duran's Red Carpet Massacre tour at the Birmingham NIA and the O2 Arena in London and on the John Peel stage at Glastonbury.

After "Couples", the band decided to release a compilation of their rare early 7" singles, which was titled "Singles" on 20 October 2008 on Angular Records. The twelve track album collected all of the songs from the band's first singles. The version of "Separated By Motorways" differs from the single version produced by Paul Epworth, instead the group opted to include the demo version instead. The compilation also featured one previously unreleased song – "Peterborough". "Singles" was named the 25th best album of 2008 by Artrocker magazine.

Breakup and post-breakup
On 20 October 2008, Guitarist Dorian Cox posted a message on their official website that the band had split up. The main motivation for the break-up was Cox's stroke in June 2008, which resulted in a swath of cancelled gigs. Cox thanked fans for their support and goodwill. "We have decided to call it a day," he wrote. "The main reason for this is that I suffered from a stroke in June and unfortunately I do not know when/if I will be well enough to play the guitar again. On behalf of the band I'd like to say a big thank you to anyone who ever came to one of our shows, bought one of our records or danced to one of our songs in a club." The announcement was made the same day their compilation "Singles" was released, with the inside of the rear album art also containing news of the break-up. Upon their split, The Guardian wrote an article entitled "Why music will miss the Long Blondes".

It was reported on 1 December 2008 that Cox was undergoing physiotherapy for his paralysis and is still hoping to get back to playing guitar.

Jackson has been working on her debut solo album with producer and ex-Suede guitarist Bernard Butler. She will be working under the name Madame Ray (after the song on Someone To Drive You Home). Jackson has said that the sound of the album first tended towards country rock but has now become a "big pop record". She released the album 'British Road Movies' in early 2016.

Dorian Cox's new band is called Unmade Bed and have made a number of songs available on-line.

Hollis continues to play in The Bon Bon Club, a band she formed with Louder. Their debut single features three cover versions—"Lullaby" by The Cure, "Love Is Blind" by Pulp and "Romantic Rights" by Death From Above 1979. It was released through Thee Sheffield Phonographic Corporation on 23 June 2008. The 7" single was limited to 500 copies.

Hollis also plays with Nature Set and their first single 7" has been published by Elefant Records in 2011.

Reunion

On the 17th of December 2021, Kate Jackson and Dorian Cox reformed The Long Blondes as a duo to perform at the opening of an art installation by Jackson in Leicester, England. In early 2022 it was confirmed on a podcast interview with Martyn Ware that Jackson and Cox had begun work on a new album by The Long Blondes. In April 2022 it was announced that the duo would be making their official live debut at Green Man Festival in Powys, Wales in the summer. The band actually played their first reunion gig in Salford on July 8th 2022.

On August 11th, 2022, Jackson announced she would be stepping away from the Long Blondes due to allegations made against Cox by his ex-girlfriend Victoria Lane via social media until the matter was resolved by the police.

Musical style

Influences
The Long Blondes' songs reflect a number of influences, including 60s pop, Buzzcocks, The Fall, The Ramones, Suede, post-punk and new wave. Jackson's vocals have been compared to Ari Up of The Slits, Deborah Harry of Blondie and Lesley Woods of Au Pairs. The music features angular guitars and prominent bass guitar lines. However, the band themselves claim somewhat more eclectic influences than their sound suggests, citing Burt Bacharach, Holland-Dozier-Holland, Chinn and Chapman, and Stock, Aitken and Waterman as influences.
The band named some of their actual influences and favourite bands. Chaplin's were The Smiths, Sweet and The Jesus and Mary Chain. Hollis's were Belle and Sebastian, ELO and The Eagles. Cox's were ABBA and The Fall. Louder's were Scott Walker, The Slits and Captain Beaky. Jackson's were The Smiths, The Fall and Nancy Sinatra and Lee Hazlewood. Screech Louder cited Siouxsie and the Banshees, a group they were likened by the critics. Louder said about them: "[Siouxsie and the Banshees] made much more interesting records than any of the instant hits could manage, and they didn’t run out of ideas after the first few singles. Like Pulp, they’re testament to the power of waiting".

Intertextual references
The Long Blondes are known for referencing films, singers, starlets and artists in their music. Screech Louder said that Alfred Hitchcock was a big inspiration when it came to referencing films in their music, he said "the whole film noir thing is very important because it's stylish but there's depth to it as well".

Lyrics
 "Appropriation (By Any Other Name)" is a homage to Hitchcock's 1958 film Vertigo. It has been said that the song is told from Judy's perspective, due to lines such as "When I met you, I never wore dresses like that" & "You can't have me, make me act the same". Lead singer Kate Jackson painted two different portraits for the CD single and 7" Vinyl, they both depicted Kim Novak's characters Madeleine Elster and Judy Barton.
 "Darts" mentions British darts player Bobby George and darts commentator Sid Waddell.
 "Erin O'Connor" is a homage to Erin O'Connor which also mentions fellow model, Lily Cole. It begins with a line by Ronnie Corbett and David Swift from the BBC play No Sex Please, We're British.
 "Five Ways To End It" mentions Carry On star Hattie Jacques and also the producer of the Carry On films, Peter Rogers.
 "I Liked The Boys" ends with "Not the most original sentiment I've ever heard, so what's new" which is a line from a radio show by Terry Wogan. Whilst recording the second album, they found an old reel-to-reel radio recording and decided to use parts in some of their songs.
 "I'm Going To Hell" ends with a line by Peter Sellers.
 "Long Blonde" mentions punk band Ramones, one of their influences.
 "Lust in the Movies" mentions underground actresses such as 60's socialite and muse, Edie Sedgwick, American actress Arlene Dahl & French actress Anna Karina. Also the repeated line "Nag nag nag" is a reference to the same repeated lyric in the song "Nag Nag Nag" by Sheffield band Cabaret Voltaire.
 "Madame Ray" is inspired by Lee Miller, the photographer and muse of avent-garde artist Man Ray.
 "Melville Farr" is based on Dirk Bogarde's character in the 1961 British film Victim.
 "Never To Be Repeated" references film-star Greta Garbo.
 "Only Lovers Left Alive" takes its title from the 1964 science fiction novel by Dave Wallis, and includes the title of 1950s film From Here To Eternity as a lyric.
 "Round The Hairpin" begins with a line by British comedian Kenny Everett.
 "Swallow Tattoo" has a lyric ("you fill me with inertia") which is a reference to the parody pop band fronted by Peter Cook in Bedazzled.
 "You Could Have Both" namechecks American singer Scott Walker. The song also alludes to the Morrissey song "My Love Life". The song also mentions the character of C.C. 'Bud' Baxter from The Apartment.

Artwork
 Before "Couples" was released, all five members created their own cryptic promo videos "explaining" what the inspiration behind "Couples" was. Jackson explained who inspired the album cover, she found artist Richard Hamilton, videos by ABBA, Lee Miller and Le Corbusier to be the main inspiration.
 The two front covers of "Weekend Without Makeup" are paintings of Diana Dors.
 The front cover of their debut album Someone To Drive You Home is a painting by Kate Jackson of Faye Dunaway in the film Bonnie and Clyde, with a Mark 3 Ford Cortina as her getaway car. The artwork inside the album sleeve is a painting of Nicolas Cage & Laura Dern in the film Wild at Heart.
 The front cover of "New Idols" is a painting of Diana Dors in Yield to the Night.

Style
Front-woman Kate Jackson was featured in The Guardian's style section and NME's Cool List, moving from 39 in 2005 to 7 in 2006. When questioned about her place in the first NME list by The Guardian, Jackson remarked "Probably because they didn't have enough girls. It was so overrun with boring boys, they needed someone to bring a touch of glamour." Jackson describes her style as "Bonnie Parker meets a Carry On girl".

Discography

Albums

Compilations

Singles and EPs

Other releases
"Christmas Is Cancelled" was released by the band on a limited run of CD-Rs in Christmas 2004.

Music videos
The Long Blondes were also known for their cheap and glamorous music videos. Their first proper music video was "Appropriation (By Any Other Name)" which was directed by Rupert Noble, a music video director they regularly made videos with after.

Awards and nominations
In 2006 The Long Blondes received the Philip Hall Radar Award at the NME Awards honouring rising talent, which in previous years has accurately predicted big things for Kaiser Chiefs and Franz Ferdinand.

References

External links

Live video of Long Blondes, Cake Shop NYC, 22 June 2005 (RealPlayer, mp4)

Rough Trade Records artists
English indie rock groups
Musical groups from Sheffield
Musical groups established in 2003
Musical groups disestablished in 2008
Post-punk revival music groups
British indie pop groups
NME Awards winners
2003 establishments in England